Barnaby and Me is a 1978 Australian made-for-television film about a girl and her talking koala Barnaby who are pursued by criminals.

The film was one of six TV movies made in Australia by Transatlantic Enterprises along with the ABC. Barnaby and Me was made in association with Six Flags, presented as the theme park company's first foray into the movie business.

It was the final film directed by Norman Panama.

Cast
Sid Caesar as Leo Fisk.
Juliet Mills as Jennifer, a young widow of a famed traveler and hunter.
Sally Boyden as Linda, daughter of Jennifer.
Hugh Keays-Byrne as Huggins, employee at an international syndicate.
Additionally, Rangi Nicols plays Ko, a native of the mysterious outback colony of Happy Valley. John Newcombe also appears as himself in a scene where competes with Barnaby in a frenzied match on the court.

Production
It was the second film from Transatlantic Enterprises, following No Room to Run. The film was announced in November 1976 as Billy. Another working title was Fuzzy.

Australian singer Sally Boyden turned down the chance to tour with Liberace to make the movie. John Newcombe has a cameo where he plays a game of tennis against Caesar.

Filming took place from mid November 1976 to mid January 1977.

Caesar was addicted to alcohol and pills and the time and later wrote in his memoirs that on the flight out "I took my usual ration of booze and pills and passed out completely. When the plane landed in New Zealand Caesar could not be woken up so they took him to hospital. His wife Florence was flown to Auckland but by the time she arrived Caesar had gone to Sydney. Norman Panama requested Florence stay on the set to ensure Caesar completed the film. Caesar wrote "she did and she got me to work every day, in reasonably usable condition." However Caesar said he could not remember anything about making the movie or any of the time he spent in Australia.

References

Notes

External links

Barnaby and Me at Letterbox DVD
Barnaby and Me at AustLit
Barnaby and Me at IMDb

Australian television films
Australian crime films
1978 television films
1978 films
1978 crime films
Australian adventure films
1970s adventure films
1970s English-language films
Films directed by Norman Panama